William Edward Garrett (21 March 1920 – 30 May 1993) was a British Labour Party politician.

Garrett was educated at the London School of Economics and was an engineer and maintenance fitter. He was a councillor on Northumberland County Council and Prudhoe Urban District Council.

Garrett contested Hexham in 1955 and Doncaster in 1959.
He was Member of Parliament for Wallsend from 1964 until he retired in 1992.  His successor was Stephen Byers.  Garrett died the following year, aged 73.

References
The Times Guide to the House of Commons, Times Newspapers Ltd, 1955, 1966, 1987 & 1992

External links 
 

1920 births
1993 deaths
Amalgamated Engineering Union-sponsored MPs
Labour Party (UK) MPs for English constituencies
Alumni of the London School of Economics
UK MPs 1964–1966
UK MPs 1966–1970
UK MPs 1970–1974
UK MPs 1974
UK MPs 1974–1979
UK MPs 1979–1983
UK MPs 1983–1987
UK MPs 1987–1992
Councillors in Northumberland